The Gotha Program was the party platform adopted by the nascent Social Democratic Party of Germany (SPD) at its initial party congress, held in the town of Gotha in 1875. The program called for universal suffrage, freedom of association, limits on the working day, and for other laws protecting the rights and health of workers. The Gotha Program was explicitly socialist: "the socialist labor party of Germany endeavors by every lawful means to bring about a free state and a socialistic society, to effect the destruction of the iron law of wages by doing away with the system of wage labor, to abolish exploitation of every kind, and to extinguish all social and political inequality". It was superseded by the Erfurt Program in 1891.

Karl Marx famously attacked the platform, which he had read in draft form, in his Critique of the Gotha Program.

References

External links

 German text of Gotha Program at Marxists Internet Archive

Social Democratic Party of Germany
Party platforms
program
1875 documents
1875 in politics
1875 in Germany